Jonny Vaughton is a Welsh rugby union player. His usual position was wing. He started his career at Swansea before moving on to the Ospreys, making his debut against Munster in September 2005 and going on to make 63 appearances. He was released by the Ospreys at the end of the 2009–10 season.

He competed internationally for Wales sevens at the 2006 Commonwealth Games.

References

Ospreys (rugby union) players
Welsh rugby union players
Living people
1982 births
Rugby union wings